State Bank of India Kerala Football Club, also known as SBI Kerala FC (formerly known as SBT Thiruvananthapuram), was a football club based in Thiruvananthapuram, Kerala. It last competed in the Kerala Premier League, the top tier league of the state.

History 
During the mid-1980s, already established as a premier bank in the state of Kerala and the considering the popularity and passion towards the game of football at the region, State Bank of Travancore decided to launch a team of its own and register it with Kerala Football Association in November 1986. The debut of the team was in 1987 in the Trivandrum District 'E' Division League, the 5th division league of the region. The team steadily progressed further and went on to reach the 'B' Division to win the trophy in 1992, thus entering the 'A' Division League, the Tier-1 league of the region in 1993–94.

Growth 
At that point, the bank stepped in again by recruiting sportsmen under a special sports quota, pioneering a new trend among the government-controlled Public Sector Undertakings. This received a further impetus when N. M. Najeeb, a prominent national player at that time, agreed to coach the team. The club then evolved from a group of amateur players and went on to win various trophies. It also qualified and participated in many national level tournaments like Durand Cup, IFA Shield, Rover's Cup, Scissors Cup, Kalinga Cup and the Federation Cup.

Entry to National Football League 
Being the state champions in the 1996, SBT was eligible to play in the newly formed National Football League introduced by the All India Football Federation that year, but the emergence of the first professional football club from the state FC Cochin denied its opportunity. However, SBT was given an entry to the 2nd Division NFL, introduced in 1997–98 as a qualifying round for the top division. The team, though a hot favorite with the likes of National players Jiju Jacob, V. P. Shaji, Feroz Sheriff, A. Sunil Kumar and K. V. Dhanesh, could not qualify as it ended runner-up with a draw against Sesa Sports Club in the final game of the season.

The next season (1998–99) was the highpoint in SBT's history as it emerged the champions in the 2nd Division NFL, being the only institutional team till date to win the same. It also got promoted to the National Football League, but the glory did not last long as the team performed poorly and again got relegated to the second division.

It once again qualified for the National Football League in 2004–05 but after that, there were hardly any notable achievement for the club at the national level.

Last developments
Pursuant to the directions of AIFF, SBT formed a junior team. It entered the 'E' Division of Trivandrum District League in 2007 and in less than a decade, it has reached the super division, winning all the lower division leagues and was clubbed with SBT's senior team, giving SBT the distinction of fielding two teams in the Super Division, a first in the history of Trivandrum League.

The future of the club was in threat after the merger between the State Bank of India with State Bank of Travancore in April 2017. But the new management decided to continue with the football team and the club took part in 2016-17 Kerala Premier League with a new name SBI Kerala.

Honours
National Football League II
Champions (2): 1998–99, 2004
 Kerala Football League
Champions (4): 2000–01, 2003–04, 2006–07, 2008
Runners-up (3): 1998–99, 1999–2000, 2005–06
Kerala Premier League
Champions (2): 2014–15, 2015–16
Runners-up (1): 2013–14
Kerala State Club Football Championship
Champions (6): 1996, 2002, 2008, 2013, 2015, 2017
Runners-up (3): 1997,2006,2011
G.V. Raja Football Tournament
Runner-up (1): 2010
 Mammen Mappillai Trophy – 1996
 Arlem Cup
 Kerala Kaumudi Trophy
 JC Jacob Trophy
 Meyers Cup :Champions  : 2019

See also
 Football in Kerala
 List of football clubs in India
 Indian Bank Recreational Club

References 

Football clubs in Kerala
Association football clubs established in 1986
1986 establishments in Kerala
Financial services association football clubs in India
State Bank of India